Ray Dunlop (1904/1905 – 27 December 1974, and also spelled Roy Dunlop) was an Australian tennis player who won the 1931 Australian Championships in men's doubles. He was also a finalist in the 1934 Australian Championships in mixed doubles. He was a nephew of Alfred Dunlop, 1908 Australasian Championships doubles champion and singles runner-up.

Grand Slam tournament finals

Doubles (1 title)

Mixed Doubles (1 final)

References

External links
 

Australian male tennis players
Grand Slam (tennis) champions in men's doubles
Year of birth missing
1974 deaths
Place of birth missing
Grand Slam (tennis) champions in boys' doubles
Australian Championships (tennis) junior champions
Australian Championships (tennis) champions